Abdul Rahman bin Daud is a politician from UMNO. He was the Member of Parliament for Pasir Mas from 1978 to 1982.

Election results

See also 
 Pasir Mas (federal constituency)

References 

United Malays National Organisation politicians
Possibly living people
Year of birth missing (living people)
Living people